The Jefferson Monument by Moses Jacob Ezekiel is located outside the Louisville Metro Hall in Louisville, Kentucky, US.

History
The monument to Founding Father Thomas Jefferson was created in 1899 by Sir Moses Ezekiel. It was commissioned as one of two sculptures for the exterior of the Jefferson County Courthouse; the other statue honors Louis XIV.

The Jefferson statue was presented to the city of Louisville by the Bernheim Brothers, two wealthy, public-spirited businessmen of the city, in November 1901. It was unveiled at ceremonies that included addresses by former Governor of Kentucky William O'Connell Bradley and Mayor Charles P. Weaver. It stands on Jefferson street in front of the Jefferson County Court House, the architecture of the later forming an effective background.

Description
The subject is well conceived and executed with power and artistic taste. On the outside of this bell at four equidistant points are modeled figures, representing Liberty, Equality, Justice and the Brotherhood of Man. The statue symbolizing Liberty shows the Goddess of Liberty starting forward bursting the chains from her arms. She occupies the front of the pedestal and the flowing drapery and vigorous motion of the figure are incisively portrayed. Justice, with bandaged eyes, is shown with drawn sword in one and hand and scales in the other. Equality is typified in female form, represented in the act of casting from her the law of primo-geniture, and treading under foot the Stamp Act.

Clarke & Loomis of Louisville were the constructing architects, and the bronze was cast in Berlin, Germany. The sculptor is Sir Moses Ezekiel, who designed the granite pedestal and executed the models for statuary at his studio in Rome.

A smaller replica of the monument stands at the University of Virginia.

See also
 List of statues of Thomas Jefferson
 List of sculptures of presidents of the United States
 Jefferson Memorial, Washiongton, D.C.

References

Monuments and memorials in Kentucky
1901 sculptures
Public art in Louisville, Kentucky
Outdoor sculptures in Kentucky
Statues of Thomas Jefferson
Sculptures of Moses Jacob Ezekiel
United States Declaration of Independence in art